Henry Jordan (19 November 1818 – 30 June 1890) was a dentist and member of the Legislative Assembly of Queensland, Secretary for Public Lands 1887 to 1888.

Jordan was born in Lincoln, Lincolnshire, England, the son of John Jordan, a Wesleyan minister from Devonshire stock, and his wife Elizabeth, née Jeffries.

Jordan was educated by his father, entered Kingsford College, Bristol, and then studied at London Institution for Diseases of the Teeth. Jordan built up a lucrative dental practice in Derby. He published Practical observations on the Teeth (London, 1851) which ran to two editions and was highly praised in England and America; it later won him election to the Odontological Society of Great Britain.

In February 1856 Jordan arrived in Queensland and in 1859 he married Sarah Elizabeth Hopkins Turner. Jordan was a member of the first Board of Education in Queensland, and represented the Town of Brisbane in the first session of the first Parliament. From January 1861 to December 1866 he was in London as Commissioner and Agent-General for Immigration, and from 23 December 1868 to 20 October 1871 he sat in the Assembly as member for East Moreton. In 1875, he was appointed Registrar-General, which office he held until 1883. He was elected to the Assembly for South Brisbane on 21 August 1883. In August 1887 he succeeded Charles Dutton as Secretary for Public Lands, and went out of office with his colleagues in June 1888. At the general election on 12 May 1888 he was re-elected for South Brisbane. Jordan died on 30 June 1890 at his home, Sherwood, survived by his wife, four sons and three daughters (four other children predeceased him). Jordan was buried in the Sherwood Anglican Churchyard in Brisbane.

A park along the Logan River in Waterford West, Logan City is named after Jordan. His daughter, May Jordan McConnel, was a notable trade unionist and suffragist.

References

Members of the Queensland Legislative Assembly
1818 births
1890 deaths
English emigrants to colonial Australia
English dentists
People from Lincoln, England
19th-century Australian politicians
19th-century Australian public servants
19th-century dentists